The 2006 Grand Prix de Futsal was the second edition of the international futsal competition of the same kind as the FIFA Futsal World Cup but with invited nations and held annually in Brazil.

Venues

Caxias do Sul/Rio Grande do Sul (BRA)
Hall: Ginásio José Jacinto Maria de Godoy (SESI) - 5.000 seats

Teams

Group A

Group B

First round

Group A

Group B

Second round

Classification 1st–4th

Semi-finals

3rd/4th place match

Final

Winner

References

Grand Prix de Futsal
Grand Prix de Futsal
Grand Prix De Futsal, 2006